is a 1957 color Japanese film directed by Kenji Misumi.

Cast 
 Ichikawa Raizō VIII as Momotarō aka Shinnosuke Wakagi
 Yoko Uraji as Yuri
 Seizaburo Kawazu as Hankuro Iga
 Michiyo Kogure as Kosuzu Hanabusa
 Shunji Sakai as Inosuke

References

External links 
  http://www.raizofan.net/link4/movie2/momo.htm
 

1957 films
Films directed by Kenji Misumi
Daiei Film films
1950s Japanese films